Cusveorth Coombe is a hamlet in the parish of Kea, Cornwall, England.

References

Hamlets in Cornwall